Anne Speckhard is an Adjunct Associate Professor of Psychiatry at Georgetown University School of Medicine in Washington D.C. Her research focuses on developing counter-terrorism initiatives and understanding the motivations of terrorists.  She is the Director of the International Center for the Study of Violent Extremism (ICSVE).

Research 
Speckhard's research focuses on understanding the psychology behind terrorism. She has consulted almost 500 terrorists as well as their family and friends. She created the psychological challenge from the Detainee Rehabilitation Program located in Iraq as well as running the Breaking the ISIS Brand Counternarratives Project. It has been devoted to more than 20,000 detainees and 800 juveniles. Additionally, she has focused on the role of women in terrorist organizations.

Bibliography 
Talking to Terrorists (2012)
Fetal Abduction (2012)
Warrior Princess (2013)
Timothy Tottle's Terrific Dream (2014)
Undercover Jihadi (2014)
Timothy Tottle's Terrific Crocodiles (2015)
Bride of Isis (2015)

References 

Living people
Year of birth missing (living people)
Place of birth missing (living people)
Georgetown University Medical Center faculty
American women non-fiction writers
Experts on terrorism
American women academics
21st-century American women